The Shire of Cook (The Shire) is a local government area in Far North Queensland, Australia. The Shire covers most of the eastern and central parts of Cape York Peninsula, the most northerly section of the Australian mainland.

The shire was established in 1919.

The Daintree and Hann Divisions were created on 11 November 1879 as two of 74 divisions around Queensland under the Divisional Boards Act 1879.

With the passage of the Local Authorities Act 1902, they became the Shires of Daintree and Hann on 31 March 1903.

On 16 January 1919, they merged to form the Shire of Cook.

The Borough of Cooktown was proclaimed as a separate municipality on 3 April 1876 under the Municipal Institutions Act 1864. On 24 August 1932, the Town of Cooktown (the successor to the Borough of Cooktown) was absorbed back into Cook Shire.

Prior to 2005, a number of Aboriginal communities administered under Deed of Grant in Trust by community councils were part of the Shire's area, but they were formally excised and given a new status as Aboriginal Shires. This formed part of the Meeting Challenges, Making Choices strategy developed in response to the Cape York Justice Study undertaken by Justice Fitzgerald QC in November 2001.

The Local Government Reform process in July 2007 concluded that amalgamation of the Shire would not result in any benefits to service delivery and management for the area, noting that it was (and is) the largest local government by area and had no community of interest with any neighbouring areas. The council was, however, reduced from seven to six councillors with an additional elected mayor.

Towns and localities 
The Shire of Cook includes the following settlements:

 Cooktown (pop 1,336)
 Laura (pop 570)
 Coen (pop 253)
 Archer River
 Ayton
 Bloomfield1
 Dixie
 Ebagoola
 Edward River
 Helenvale
 Holroyd River
 Hope Vale2
 Iron Range
 Jardine River
 Lakefield
 Lakeland

 Lizard
 Lizard Island
 Lockhart River3
 Mapoon4
 Marton
 Merapah
 Mission River
 Moojeeba
 Palmer
 Port Stewart
 Portland Road
 Rossville
 Shelburne
 Starcke
 Wenlock
 Yarraden

1 – shared with the Shire of Douglas

2 – shared with the Aboriginal Shire of Hope Vale

3 – shared with the Aboriginal Shire of Lockhart River

4 – shared with the Aboriginal Shire of Mapoon

And also a number of islands in the Coral Sea, including:
 Raine Island
 Lizard Island (in the locality of Lizard)

Libraries 
The Cook Shire Council operate public libraries at Bloomfield and Cooktown.

Chairmen and mayors
 1901–1904: John Hargreaves
 1927: H. L. Lee 
 2008–present : Peter Hugh Scott

Population
The population of the Shire of Cook, along with Torres, Aurukun and Mornington, have been singled out by the Australian Bureau of Statistics (ABS), who conduct the quinquennial census, as particularly difficult to measure accurately. Reasons for this include cultural and language barriers, transport and geographical spread of the population, who are mostly located in isolated communities. As such, all figures are likely to be lower than the actual population on the census date. Additionally, prior to 1971, Aboriginal people who form a majority of the population were not counted in census statistics.

Until 1 July 2002, the Australian Bureau of Statistics included the Island and DOGIT councils within the Shire of Cook statistical local area. Information for the reduced Shire back to 1996 has been provided on the ABS website through the Time Series Profile.

Indigenous languages 
Guugu Yimithirr (also known as Koko Yindjir, Gugu Yimidhirr, Guguyimidjir) is an Australian Aboriginal language of Hope Vale and the Cooktown area. The language region includes the local government area of the Aboriginal Shire of Hope Vale and the Shire of Cook, particularly the localities of Cape Bedford, Battle Camp and sections of the Normanby River and Annan River.

Kuku-Thaypan (also known as Gugu Dhayban, Kuku Taipan, Thaypan) is an Australian Aboriginal language spoken in Hann River, Laura and Musgrave River and on Mornington Island, within the local government boundaries of the Cook Shire.

Kuku Yalanji  (also known as Gugu Yalanji, Kuku Yalaja, and Kuku Yelandji) is an Australian Aboriginal language of the Mossman and Daintree areas of  North Queensland. The language region includes areas within the local government area of Shire of Douglas and Shire of Cook, particularly the localities of Mossman, Daintree, Bloomfield River, China Camp, Maytown, Palmer, Cape Tribulation and Wujal Wujal.

Yupanguthi  (also known as Yuputhimri, Jupangati, Yupangathi, Nggerikudi, Yupungati, Jupangati) is an Australian Aboriginal language spoken on Yupanguthi country. The Yupanguthi language region includes the landscape within the local government boundaries of the landscape within the local government boundaries of the Shire of Cook.

Linngithigh (also known as Winda Winda and Linginiti) is an Australian Aboriginal language spoken by the Linngithigh people. The Linngithigh language region includes landscape within the local government boundaries of the Cook Shire Council: Western Cape York, Winda Winda Creek, Mission River, and Archer River.

Luthigh (also known as Lotiga, Tepiti and Uradhi, see also Uradhi related languages) is an Australian Aboriginal language spoken by the Luthigh people. The traditional language area for Luthigh includes landscape within the local government boundaries of the Cook Shire: Eastern Cape York, Ducie River, Northern Peninsula, New Mapoon, Injinoo, and Cowal Creek.

Yalanji  (also known as Kuku Yalanji, Kuku Yalaja, Kuku Yelandji, and Gugu Yalanji) is an Australian Aboriginal language of Far North Queensland. The traditional language region is Mossman River in the south to the Annan River in the north, bordered by the Pacific Ocean in the east and extending inland to west of Mount Mulgrave. This includes the local government boundaries of the Shire of Douglas, the Shire of Cook and the Aboriginal Shire of Wujal Wujal and the towns and localities of Cooktown,  Mossman, Daintree, Cape Tribulation and Wujal Wujal. It includes the head of the Palmer River, the Bloomfield River, China Camp, Maytown, and Palmerville.

Yir Yiront (also known as Yiront, Jirjoront, Yir-yiront, and Kokomindjan) is an Australian Aboriginal language. Its traditional language region is in Western Cape York within the local government areas of  Aboriginal Shire of Kowanyama and Shire of Cook, in the catchments of the Coleman River and Mitchell River. Following the removal of Aboriginal people from their traditional lands, it is also spoken in Pormpuraaw and Kowanyama.

Kuuku Ya'u (also known as Gugu Yau, Yao, Ya'o, Koko Ya'o and Koka-yao) is an Australian Aboriginal language. The traditional language area of Kuuku Ya'u includes landscape within the local government boundaries of the Cook Shire: Eastern Cape York, Uu'ungun south to Claudie River and hinterland.

Kuuk Thaayorre (also known as Koko-Daiyuri, Kuku Yak, Thayorre, and used as a generic name for several related languages/dialects) is an Australian Aboriginal Language spoken on Western Cape York, particularly in the area around Pormpuraaw (Edward River). The Thaayorre language region includes the landscape within Pormpuraaw Community Council and the Cook Shire Council.

References

External links
 University of Queensland: Queensland Places: Cook Shire

 
Local government areas of Queensland
1919 establishments in Australia